= Stanford Cardinal basketball =

Stanford Cardinal basketball may refer to:

- Stanford Cardinal men's basketball
- Stanford Cardinal women's basketball
